Seahampton is a hamlet situated north of West Wallsend, New South Wales, Australia, located  west of the city of Newcastle's central business district and west of the Sydney-Newcastle Freeway. It is a suburb of the City of Lake Macquarie local government area.
 
Seahampton's origins are in coal mining. Seaham No. 1 Colliery was opened here on 6 March 1890 by the Monkwearmouth Coal Company which was reformed and renamed the Seaham Coal Company Ltd., in 1896.

Its peak production was 1,450 tons per day and the coal was shipped via the company's private railway to the New South Wales Government line at Cockle Creek Junction. 
The colliery closed on 7 July 1932, during the Great Depression, and never re-opened.

The township of Seahampton was surveyed in 1889 to provide homesites for colliery employees.

History 
The Aboriginal people, in this area, the Awabakal, were the first people of this land.

References

 Neath Mount Sugarloaf – Book 2, West Wallsend Public School Centenary Committee, 1988, pp. 34–37,

External links
 History of Seahampton

Suburbs of Lake Macquarie